Santiago Formoso (born July 4, 1953) is an American soccer defender who spent five seasons in the North American Soccer League.  He also earned seven caps with the U.S. national team in 1976 and 1977.

Club career
Santiago Formoso was born in Vigo, Spain, 1953. He emigrated to the United States in 1969, following his father, a merchant seaman. He established in Newark, New Jersey, and attended Kearny High School, graduating in 1973. He also played with Newark Beira-Mar. His father became a cook in Long Island, while his mother worked in a clothing factory. His father died of cancer in 1974.

After high school, Formoso attended the University of Pennsylvania where he played on the men’s soccer team. While at university, he became a U.S. citizen. In 1976, Formoso left the university and signed with the Hartford Bicentennials of the North American Soccer League (NASL).  The team moved from Hartford to New Haven, Connecticut between the 1976 and 1977 seasons, making a name change with the move.  At the end of the 1977 season, the Bicentennials relocated to Oakland, California and Formoso decided to terminate his contract to remain close to his mother. Next, he joined the New York Cosmos.  He spent two seasons in New York before being traded to the Los Angeles Aztecs.  However, he played only eleven games of the 1980 season before moving to the Houston Hurricane for the last ten games of that season.  In 1982, he played for the Carolina Lightnin' in the American Soccer League.  In 1984, he played for the Charlotte Gold in the United Soccer League.  With the collapse of the USL, Formoso moved north to play for Greek American AA in the Cosmopolitan Soccer League.

International career
In 1975, while at the university, Formoso was called into the U.S. Olympic soccer team as it ran through the qualification campaign for the 1976 Summer Olympics.  However, two losses to Mexico in August 1975 kept the U.S. out of the Olympics. Formoso was on the American team at the 1975 Pan American Games. 

Formoso earned his first of seven caps with the U.S. national team on October 3, 1976. That game, a qualifier for the 1978 FIFA World Cup ended in a scoreless tie with Mexico. Formoso’s next game with the national team did not end so well when the U.S. lost 3–0 twelve days later to Mexico in Puebla.  Formoso then played in two friendlies with Haiti before playing in the U.S. loss to Canada on December 22, 1976, which bumped the U.S. from contention for the World Cup finals.  Formoso played two games in 1977, his last was a 1–0 victory over China on October 10, 1977.

After retirement

MetroStars
Formoso was also a part of the MetroStars marketing department from at least 1988 until his firing in 2001.

Honors
Formoso was inducted into the Hudson County, New Jersey Sports Hall of Fame in 1995.

References

External links
 NASL/MISL stats

1953 births
American soccer players
American Soccer League (1933–1983) players
Carolina Lightnin' players
Buffalo Stallions players
Charlotte Gold players
Connecticut Bicentennials players
Greek American AA players
Houston Hurricane players
Kearny High School (New Jersey) alumni
Los Angeles Aztecs players
Major Indoor Soccer League (1978–1992) players
People from Kearny, New Jersey
American people of Galician descent
New York Cosmos players
North American Soccer League (1968–1984) players
Spanish emigrants to the United States
Pan American Games competitors for the United States
Footballers at the 1975 Pan American Games
United States men's international soccer players
Living people
United Soccer League (1984–85) players
Sportspeople from Hudson County, New Jersey
Footballers from Vigo
Penn Quakers men's soccer players
North American Soccer League (1968–1984) indoor players
Association football defenders
Soccer players from New Jersey
Spanish footballers